The simple-station Calle 63 is part of the TransMilenio mass-transit system of Bogotá, Colombia, opened in the year 2000.

Location

The station is located in northern Bogotá, specifically on Avenida Caracas, between Calles 60 and 63.

History

In 2000, phase one of the TransMilenio system was opened between Portal de la 80 and Tercer Milenio, including this station.

The station is named Calle 63 due to its proximity to the arterial route of the same name.

It serves the Chapinero, San Luis, and La Esperanza neighborhoods.

The nearest point of interest is the Plaza de Lourdes, about 150 meters from the station.

Station Services

Old trunk services

Main Line Service

Special services 
Also, the following special route works:
  Circular to the neighborhood Bosque Calderón.

Inter-city service

This station does not have inter-city service.

See also
Bogotá
TransMilenio
List of TransMilenio Stations

External links
TransMilenio
suRumbo.com

TransMilenio